Charaxes gerdae is a butterfly in the family Nymphalidae. It is found in western Tanzania and the Democratic Republic of the Congo (Katanga). The habitat consists of Brachystegia woodland (Miombo) at altitudes from 900 to 1,400 meters.

References

External links
Charaxes gerdae images at Consortium for the Barcode of Life

Butterflies described in 1989
gerdae